Chondrocladia is a genus of carnivorous demosponges of the family Cladorhizidae. Neocladia was long considered a junior synonym, but has recently become accepted as a distinct genus.

33 named species are placed in this genus at present, but at least two additional undescribed ones are known to exist, while some of the described ones are known only from a few specimens or (e.g. the enigmatic Chondrocladia occulta) just a single one, and their validity and/or placement in Chondrocladia is doubtful. Chondrocladia sponges are stipitate, with a stalk frequently anchored in the substrate by rhizoids and an egg-shaped body, sometimes with branches that end in inflatable spheres.

Fossils assignable to this genus are known since the Pleistocene, less than 2 million years ago. But given its deep sea habitat, Chondrocladia may well have been around for much longer – perhaps since the Mesozoic, as  characteristic spicules (termed "microcricorhabds" or "trochirhabds"), almost identical to those of some living Chondrocladia, are known from Early Jurassic rocks almost 200 million years old.

Carnivory
These sponges gained media attention when a new species, a gourd-shaped carnivorous sponge, was featured in reports of finds off the coast of Antarctica. The new Chondrocladia was one of 76 sponge species identified in the seas off Antarctica by the Antarctic Benthic Deep-Sea Biodiversity Project (ANDEEP) between 2002 and 2005, conducted aboard the German research vessel Polarstern.

Carnivorous sponges, which use hooked spicules to capture small crustaceans, have been known only since 1995, when Asbestopluma hypogea, another genus of the family Cladorhizidae, was identified in Mediterranean sea caves offshore La Ciotat (France) by Jean Vacelet and Nicole Boury-Esnault. Carnivory has since turned out to be common and typical for this sponge family. Unlike their relatives, Chondrocladia still possesses the water flow system and choanocytes typical of sponges, albeit highly modified to inflate balloon-like structures that are used for capturing prey.

Species
The known species of Chondrocladia are:

 Chondrocladia albatrossi Tendal, 1973
 Chondrocladia amphactis (Schmidt, 1880)
 Chondrocladia antarctica Hentschel, 1914
 Chondrocladia arenifera Brøndsted, 1929
 Chondrocladia asigmata Lévi, 1964
 Chondrocladia burtoni Tendal, 1973
 Chondrocladia clavata Ridley & Dendy, 1886
 Chondrocladia concrescens (Schmidt, 1880)
 Chondrocladia crinita Ridley & Dendy, 1886
 Chondrocladia dichotoma Lévi, 1964
 Chondrocladia fatimae Boury-Esnault & Van Beveren, 1982
 Chondrocladia gigantea (Hansen, 1885)
 Chondrocladia gracilis Lévi, 1964
 Chondrocladia grandis (Verrill, 1879)
 Chondrocladia guiteli Topsent, 1904
 Chondrocladia koltuni Vacelet, 2006
 Chondrocladia lampadiglobus Vacelet, 2006 – Ping-pong Tree Sponge
 Chondrocladia latrunculioides Lopes, Bravo & Hajdu, 2011
 Chondrocladia levii Cristobo, Urgorri & Ríos, 2005
 Chondrocladia lyra Lee et al., 2012
 Chondrocladia magna Tanita, 1965
 Chondrocladia latrunculioides Lopes, Bravo & Hajdu, 2011
 Chondrocladia multichela Lévi, 1964
 Chondrocladia nani Boury-Esnault & Van Beveren, 1982
 Chondrocladia nicolae Cristobo, Urgorri & Ríos, 2005
 Chondrocladia occulta (Lehnert, Stone & Heimler, 2006)
 Chondrocladia pulvinata Lévi, 1964
 Chondrocladia rogersi Hestetun, Rapp & Xavier, 2017
 Chondrocladia robertballardi Cristobo, Rios, Pomponi & Xavier, 2015
 Chondrocladia saffronae Goodwin, Berman, Downey & Hendry, 2017
 Chondrocladia schlatteri Lopes, Bravo & Hajdu, 2011
 Chondrocladia scolionema Lévi, 1993
 Chondrocladia stipitata Ridley & Dendy, 1886
 Chondrocladia tasmaniensis Vacelet, Kelly & Schlacher-Hoenlinger, 2009
 Chondrocladia turbiformis Vacelet, Kelly & Schlacher-Hoenlinger, 2009
 Chondrocladia vaceleti Cristobo, Urgorri & Ríos, 2005
 Chondrocladia verticillata Topsent, 1920
 Chondrocladia virgata Thomson, 1873 (type species)
 Chondrocladia yatsui Topsent, 1930

C. alaskensis and C. pulchra are better placed in Crambe or Monanchora.

C. dura, C. ramosa and C. sessilis are junior synonyms of Iotrochota purpurea.

C. flabelliformis is now in Neocladia.

References

External links

 
Cladorhizidae